Camden is a town in Kent County, Delaware, United States. It is part of the Dover, Delaware Metropolitan Statistical Area. The population was 3,464 at the 2010 census.

History
Camden was established in 1783 as a community originally known as Mifflin's Crossroads. The community of Mifflin's Crossroads was a Quaker settlement laid out by Daniel Mifflin on the Piccadilly tract. The town originally gained some commercial trade through wharves in nearby Forest Landing and Lebanon on the St. Jones River. From these wharves, regular boat service connected the area to Philadelphia and New York City, with local merchants shipping cordwood, staves, grain, and Spanish-oak bark. The Delaware Railroad was built through nearby Wyoming in the 1850s and expanded the market for local farm products, bringing increased prosperity to Camden. The town has numerous historic properties and part of it is designated as the Camden Historic District. In addition, Brecknock, Camden Friends Meetinghouse, Star Hill AME Church, and Zion African Methodist Episcopal Church are all listed individually on the National Register of Historic Places.

On February 22, 1975, a vote was held to merge with the bordering town of Wyoming; the residents of Camden voted 117 to 49 in favor of merging the towns, but the measure failed when Wyoming residents voted against the measure by a similar proportion in reverse: 113 against to 78 in favor. The Wyoming town council had previously opposed a merger attempt in 1967.

Geography
Camden is located at  (39.1134458, –75.5418687).

Because of the small size of this town, and its even smaller neighbor of Wyoming, the U.S. Postal Service has jointly assigned the towns a single ZIP code, 19934, which is designated as the Camden-Wyoming ZIP code.

Climate
The climate in this area is characterized by hot, humid summers and generally mild to cool winters. According to the Köppen Climate Classification system, Camden has a humid subtropical climate, abbreviated "Cfa" on climate maps.

Infrastructure

Transportation

U.S. Route 13 runs north–south through the eastern part of Camden, heading north toward Dover and south toward Salisbury. U.S. Route 13 Alternate passes north–south through the center of Camden on Main Street. Delaware Route 10 runs east–west through Camden on Camden Wyoming Avenue, heading west through rural western Kent County to the Maryland border and east toward Dover Air Force Base. DART First State provides bus service to Camden along Route 104, which runs from the Walmart in Camden north to the Dover Transit Center in Dover and connects to other local bus routes serving the Dover area; Route 117, which runs from the Walmart in Camden south to Harrington; and Route 303, which heads north to Dover and south to Georgetown.

Utilities
Delmarva Power, a subsidiary of Exelon, provides electricity to Camden. Chesapeake Utilities provides natural gas to the town. The Camden-Wyoming Sewer & Water Authority provides sewer and water service to Camden and the neighboring town of Wyoming. Trash and recycling collection in Camden is provided under contract by Republic Services.

Education
Camden is located in the Caesar Rodney School District. It is divided between the boundaries of Nellie Hughes Stokes Elementary School in Camden and W. B. Simpson Elementary School in Wyoming. Students zoned to Stokes and Simpson are zoned to Fred Fifer III Middle School in Camden. Areas east of US 13 zoned to W. Reily Brown Elementary in Dover are on land zoned as commercial. Caesar Rodney High School in Camden is the comprehensive high school for the entire district.

Demographics

As of the census of 2000, there were 2,100 people, 835 households, and 573 families residing in the town. The racial makeup of the town was 76.67% White, 18.00% African American, 0.81% Native American, 1.38% Asian, 0.14% Pacific Islander, 0.90% from other races, and 2.10% from two or more races. Hispanic or Latino of any race were 2.90% of the population.

There were 835 households, out of which 35.1% had children under the age of 18 living with them, 50.2% were married couples living together, 15.3% had a female householder with no husband present, and 31.3% were non-families. 24.1% of all households were made up of individuals, and 8.4% had someone living alone who was 65 years of age or older.  The average household size was 2.51 and the average family size was 3.02.

In the town, the population was spread out, with 27.0% under the age of 18, 9.1% from 18 to 24, 30.7% from 25 to 44, 21.6% from 45 to 64, and 11.6% who were 65 years of age or older.  The median age was 36 years. For every 100 females, there were 90.9 males.  For every 100 females age 18 and over, there were 83.3 males.

The median income for a household in the town was $47,097, and the median income for a family was $50,347. Males had a median income of $32,154 versus $25,261 for females. The per capita income for the town was $21,113.  About 1.8% of families and 4.9% of the population were below the poverty line, including 4.7% of those under age 18 and 2.4% of those age 65 or over.

Government 
Mayor: Justin King
Vice-Mayor: Michael Schock
Councilwoman: Vicki Rohodes
Councilman: Dan Woodall
Councilman Larry Dougherty Sr . 
Chief of Police: Marcus Whitney

Town Manager:

Notable people
 Ashley Coleman, Miss Delaware Teen USA 1999, Miss Teen USA 1999 (born and grew up in Camden)
 Eric Buckson, born in Camden and a current Kent County Levy Court Commissioner
 Henry Hayes Lockwood, born in Camden Civil War general
 Charles L. Terry Jr., born in Camden, 65th Governor of Delaware
 R. Thomas Wagner, Jr., State Auditor of Delaware and former Mayor of Camden

References

External links

Official website

Towns in Kent County, Delaware
Towns in Delaware